is a private university, located in the city of Kōriyama, Japan.

History
Ohu University was established in 1972 as the Tohoku Dental University. It changed its name in 1989 to the Ohu University. A school of pharmacy was established in 2005.

External links
  

Private universities and colleges in Japan
Educational institutions established in 1972
Universities and colleges in Fukushima Prefecture
1972 establishments in Japan
Dental schools in Japan
Pharmacy schools in Japan
Kōriyama